Andermatt railway station is a railway station and junction on the metre gauge Furka Oberalp Bahn (FO), serving the town and municipality of Andermatt, in the canton of Uri, Switzerland. The station is connected, via the Furka Pass, with Brig and Visp in the canton of Valais, and, via the Oberalp Pass, with the western terminus of the Rhaetian Railway at Disentis/Mustér, in the canton of Graubünden.  There is also a short branch line, the Schöllenenbahn, between Andermatt and Göschenen, at the northern end of the standard gauge Gotthard Rail Tunnel.

Since 2003, the FO, including Andermatt station and the lines and trains serving it, has been owned and operated by the Matterhorn Gotthard Bahn (MGB).

The station currently has three platforms in use.

Services 
The following services stop at Andermatt:

 Regio:

See also

Furka Pass
Car shuttle train
Oberalp Pass
Matterhorn Gotthard Bahn
Furka Oberalp Bahn

Notes

Further reading

External links

 Matterhorn Gotthard Bahn
 

Railway stations in Switzerland opened in 1917
Matterhorn Gotthard Bahn stations
Railway stations in the canton of Uri
Andermatt